Phước Hải may refer to several places in Vietnam:

Phước Hải, Đất Đỏ, township of Đất Đỏ District, Bà Rịa–Vũng Tàu Province
Phước Hải, Nha Trang, urban ward of Nha Trang, in Khánh Hòa Province
Phước Hải, Ninh Phước, rural commune in Ninh Phước District, in Ninh Thuận Province